Juehuaornis is an extinct genus of ornithuromorph bird from the Early Cretaceous of present-day China. It contains a single species, J. zhangi.

Discovery and naming
The holotype, SJG 00001, was found near Lingyuan in a layer of the Jiufotang Formation dating from the Aptian. It consists of an almost complete and associated skeleton with skull, compressed on a plate. It preserves feather remains. The counterplate was designated as the paratype with inventory number SJG 00001A.

In 2015 the type species Juehuaornis zhangi was named and described by Wang Ren-fe, Wang Yan and Hu Dongyu. The generic name combines a reference to the island of Juehua, the "Chrysanthemum Island" off the coast of Liaoning, with a Greek ὄρνις, ornis, "bird". The specific name honours curator Zhang Dayong.

Description

Juehuaornis has a long beak which reaches 70% of the total skull length.

Classification
Juehuaornis was placed in the Ornithuromorpha in 2015. In 2016 it was suggested that Juehuaornis might be cogeneric to the closely related genera Changzuiornis and Dingavis found in the same formation, in which case Juehuaornis would have priority.

References

Early Cretaceous birds of Asia
Fossil taxa described in 2017
Prehistoric euornitheans